Kuttabul may refer to:

 HMAS Kuttabul (naval base)
 HMAS Kuttabul (ship)
 Kuttabul, Queensland